St. John's College High School (SJC, SJCHS, or St. John's) is a Catholic high school in Washington, D.C.. Established in 1851, is the third oldest Christian Brothers school in the United States, and the oldest Army JROTC school. It was founded by Brother John of Mary, F.S.C., and two other Christian Brothers in St. Matthew's parish, at 15th and G Streets.

History

St. John's College was established for young men by Brother John of Mary, F.S.C., and two other Christian Brothers in St. Matthew's parish, 15th and G Streets NW. The three men had been members of the faculty of Calvert Hall College, Baltimore, since its founding in 1845. Because of space limitations, in 1866 the Brothers moved the school to Carroll Hall at 10th and G Streets NW at the invitation of Father Walter. In 1868, the Brothers returned to St. Matthew's parish at the request of Father Charles White, who had built a new school named St. Matthew's Institute at the corner of 16th and L Streets NW.

In 1878, the Brothers purchased the property at 1225 Vermont Avenue NW from the estate of General Montgomery C. Meigs as the site for a new school building. In August of that year, the construction of the building was begun. At first it was known as St. John's Collegiate Institute, and finally, in 1887, it assumed the title of St. John's College. That same year, the college was incorporated under the District of Columbia statutes with the power to confer the academic degrees of Bachelor of Arts and Master of Arts. At the commencement of June 26, 1888 two Bachelor of Arts, four Bachelor of Science, and three Master of Arts degrees were conferred on graduates.

As the undergraduate departments of The Catholic University of America and Georgetown University expanded, it was decided in 1921 by the Board of Trustees of St. John's to discontinue the college department and devote the school facilities to secondary education alone. In the meantime, St. John's did pioneer work in commercial education by opening a school of commerce and finance at 13th and Massachusetts Avenue NW. Three years after the college department was discontinued, the annex building, housing the gym, swimming pool, and freshman classes, was built.

St. John's grew for the next thirty years, until it became apparent that the Vermont Avenue facilities were no longer adequate. With further expansion in mind, the Brothers purchased the present campus bounded by Rock Creek Park. This property, together with the mansion located there, provided sufficient space for the freshman classes and athletic events. As the Vermont Avenue buildings became less useful, the Brothers decided to build a new school on the Military Road Campus. The new St. John's opened to more than one thousand students in September 1959. In 1991 the school became a co-educational military optional institution.

In 1977 a man wearing a blue parka with a fur-lined hood and a surgical mask entered the cafeteria and joined the lunch line, then attempted to rob the cashier. The school business director, William McGregor, confronted the suspect and consequently was shot in the face, right leg and arm and below his right ear in the confrontation according to the police. The suspect exited the building and shot a student in the shoulder during his escape.

Athletics
St. John's teams play in the Washington Catholic Athletic Conference.

Boys' sports
 Baseball
 Basketball
 Football
 Golf
 Ice hockey
 Lacrosse
 Rugby
 Soccer
 Tennis
 Wrestling

Girls' sports
 Basketball
 Equestrian
 Field hockey
 Ice hockey
 Lacrosse
 Soccer
 Softball
 Tennis
 Volleyball

Coed sports
 Crew
 Cross country
 Swim and dive
 Track and field

Football
The 2008 St. John's vs. Gonzaga College High School football game was recognized as one of the top 25 rivalries in the nation by inclusion in the Great American Rivalry Series. In 2013 the varsity football team defeated their historical rival Gonzaga in the WCAC semi-finals, advancing to the championship game for the first time in over 20 years, which they lost to the Dematha Stags.

On November 18, 2017, St. John’s varsity football team defeated Gonzaga 30-7 to win the 2017 WCAC championship. They finished the season having gone undefeated in the WCAC for the first time since 1976 and having won the school’s first football conference championship since 1989. The 2017 team is also the only St. John's football team to ever defeat both DeMatha (first win since 1994) and Gonzaga twice in the same season. In 2017 the St. John's varsity football team finished their season ranked 17th and 19th in the country, after starting the pre-season ranked No. 21.

Soccer
In 2007, the St. John's girls' soccer team was ranked #1 in the nation in early September. After finishing with two losses for the season, they were ranked #5. In 2011 they were ranked #15 in the nation at the end of the season.

Baseball
St. John's varsity baseball team won the 2018 WCAC baseball championship, the fifth consecutive title for the school, and the sixth title since 2010.

Athletic facilities
The campus features three multi-sport turf surfaces used for field hockey, football, lacrosse, rugby, soccer and softball. Baseball plays at Gibbs Field. Gallagher Gymnasium is the home of the basketball, volleyball and wrestling teams. The school also has four tennis courts used by the tennis program.

Military program
A military cadet company was established at the school in 1915 after an inspection by the War Department, which detailed Major John Augustus Dapray, retired, to the school on December 30, 1915 as the first professor of military science and tactics. The school later established a Junior Reserve Officers' Training Corps program, and was one of 100 original U.S. Army JROTC programs established by the U.S. Congress under the National Defense Act of 1916.

In addition to regular classroom instruction, cadets participate in regional and national competitions as members of Raiders (called the Rangers until 1994), the drill team (called the "McGovern Rifles"; see notable alumni below), rifle team (marksmanship club), and color guard. The regiment participates in many events each year, such as the annual Cherry Blossom Parade and Presidential inaugurations (including the 2005 Inauguration of George W. Bush). Originally mandatory, the program became optional in 1991. By 2005, 50 percent of the students participated in the JROTC program, and current participation is less than one-fifth of the student body.

Notable alumni

 Jorge Luis Córdova (class of 1924), Associate Justice of the Supreme Court of Puerto Rico and Puerto Rico's eleventh Resident Commissioner.
 Edward H. Forney (class of 1927), United States Marine Corps brigadier general. During the Korean War he organized the largest U.S. amphibious evacuation of civilians, under combat conditions, in American history.
 Philip M. Hannan (class of 1931), the Eleventh archbishop of the Roman Catholic Archdiocese of New Orleans.
 William A. Wimsatt (class of 1935), professor of Zoology, Chairman of the Department of Zoology at Cornell University.
 John H. Dimond (class of 1936), Alaska Supreme Court justice.
 Joseph A. Rattigan (class of 1936), California state senator, justice on the California Court of Appeals.
 John F. Geisse (class of 1937), a pioneer of retailing concepts, co-founder of Target Discount Stores, founder of Venture Stores and The Wholesale Club.
 Jeremiah A. O'Leary (class of 1937), USMC veteran, prize-winning journalist, president of the White House Correspondents' Association.
 Robert M. McGovern (class of 1946), Medal of Honor recipient.
 Hugh Everett III (class of 1948), American physicist who first proposed the many-worlds interpretation (MWI) of quantum physics, which he termed his "relative state" formulation.
 Jack George (class of 1948), retired NBA player for the Philadelphia Warriors and the New York Knicks.
 Michael P. C. Carns (class of 1955), retired United States Air Force General, Vice Chief of Staff of the United States Air Force from 1991 to 1994.
 James "Jim" Kimsey (class of 1957), first chairman and CEO of AOL
 Bobby Lewis (class of 1964), retired NBA player for San Francisco Warriors and Cleveland Cavaliers.
 Collis Jones (class of 1967), retired American Basketball Association player.
 Tim Brant (class of 1967), retired sportscaster for Raycom Sports, CBS, and ABC; former VP, Sports for WJLA-TV.
 Stanley McChrystal (class of 1972), retired United States Army general who served as Director of Joint Staff.
 Tom McGrath (class of 1972), Tony-winning Broadway producer.
Joseph Siravo (class of 1973), actor, director, teacher and producer.
 Joseph Francois, (class of 1979), international economist.

 Karl Racine (class of 1981), Attorney General for the District of Columbia.
 James J. Malloy (class of 1981), retired United States Navy vice admiral.
 Raul J. Fernandez, (class of 1984), entrepreneur who founded Proxicom; Vice Chairman of Monumental Sports & Entertainment.
 Nolan Williams, Jr. (class of 1986), American composer, musicologist, and producer.
 Michael Kelly (class of 1988), athletic director of the University of South Florida.
 Kevin Plank (class of 1990), founder and owner of Under Armour, a performance apparel company.
 Notch (Norman "Mr. Notch" Howell) (class of 1993), hip-hop, R&B, reggae, dancehall and reggaeton artist
 Princess Ariana Austin Makonnen of Ethiopia (class of 2001), member of the Ethiopian Imperial House of Solomon; wife of Prince Joel Dawit Makonnen
 Branden Jacobs-Jenkins (class of 2002), playwright.
 Dwayne Anderson (class 2004), professional basketball player.
 Marissa Coleman (class of 2005), WNBA player.
 Chris Wright (class of 2007), professional basketball player.
 L.J. Hoes (class of 2008), MLB player with the Houston Astros.
 Nick Howard (class of 2011), MiLB player.
 James Palmer Jr. (class of 2014), basketball player for the Nebraska Cornhuskers.
 Dante Cunningham (transferred before graduating), NBA player.
 Shane Salerno (transferred before graduating), screenwriter and producer.
 Jeff Dowtin (class of 2015), professional basketball player for the Lakeland Magic. 
 Terrell Lewis (American football) (class of 2016) professional football player for the Los Angeles Rams. 

 James Wood (baseball) MLB player for the Washington Nationals]]

External links

References

Chevy Chase (Washington, D.C.)
Educational institutions established in 1851
Lasallian schools in the United States
Catholic secondary schools in Washington, D.C.
1851 establishments in Washington, D.C.